Round Lake is a  lake that is located mostly in Delta County, Michigan with a little portion in Alger county in the Hiawatha National Forest.  Other nearby lakes include Lake Stella, Stoner Lake, West Branch Lake, Hugaboom Lake, Blue Lake,  Ironjaw Lake, Ostrander Lake, Corner-Straits Chain and Toms Lake.

See also
List of lakes in Michigan

References 

Lakes of Alger County, Michigan
Lakes of Delta County, Michigan
Lakes of Michigan